Sir John Norwich, 1st Baronet (19 September 1613 – 9 October 1661) was an English politician who sat in the House of Commons at times between 1654 and 1660.

Norwich was created baronet of Brampton in the county of Northampton on 24 July 1641. In 1654, he was elected Member of Parliament for Northamptonshire in the First Protectorate Parliament.

In 1660, Norwich was elected MP for Northampton in the Convention Parliament. 
 
Norwich died at the age of  48

Norwich married firstly Anne Smith, daughter of Sir Roger Smith of Edmondthorp, Leicestershire. He married secondly Mary Atkins, daughter of Sir Henry Atkins of Cheshunt, He was succeeded in the baronetcy by his son by his first wife Roger.

References

1613 births
1661 deaths
People from Northampton
Place of birth missing
English MPs 1654–1655
English MPs 1660